Elaiyur (West) is a village in the Udayarpalayam taluk of Ariyalur district, Tamil Nadu, India.

Demographics 

As per the 2001 census, Elaiyur (West) had a total population of 3124 with 1572 males and 1552 females.

References 

Villages in Ariyalur district